Qaleh Now (also Romanized as Qal`eh Now; also known as Qal‘eh Now-e Hāshemābād) is a village in Behnamarab-e Jonubi Rural District, Javadabad District, Varamin County, Tehran Province, Iran. At the 2006 census, its population was 11, in 4 families.

References 

Populated places in Varamin County